Mytarka  is a village in the administrative district of Gmina Nowy Żmigród, within Jasło County, Podkarpackie Voivodeship, in southeastern Poland.

References

Mytarka